Robert Greenidge (born 28 April 1950 in Success Village, Laventille, Trinidad) is a steelpan player. He is a member of popular music singer Jimmy Buffett's Coral Reefer Band and the instrumental group Club Trini. Greenidge has also collaborated with artists such as Robert Palmer, John Lennon and Yoko Ono, Taj Mahal, Ringo Starr, Earth, Wind & Fire and Carly Simon.

Career
Greenidge began performing as a pannist at age eight and performed internationally beginning in his teens. During 1970 he represented Trinidad and Tobago as a soloist and as a member of Trinidad and Tobago National Steel Orchestra. Within the next year he migrated to the United States where he studied and played music.

Greenidge went on to play on Carly Simon's 1976 album Another Passenger, Ringo Starr's 1976 LP Ringo's Rotogravure and Robert Palmer's 1978 album Double Fun. He then performed on Grover Washington Jr.'s 1980 album Winelight and John Lennon and Yoko Ono's 1980 LP Double Fantasy. He also featured on JJ Cale's 1982 album Grasshopper, Earth Wind and Fire's 1983 album Powerlight and Jimmy Buffett's 1983 LP One Particular Harbour. Greenidge later played on Jimmy Buffett's 1984 album Riddles in the Sand and Steve Perry's 1984 LP Street Talk. Greenidge's talents were also utilized extensively on Harry Nilsson's Duit on Mon Dei, Sandman_(album), and ...That's the Way It Is. 

He went on to perform on Buffet's 1985 album Last Mango in Paris, his 1986 release Floridays, Robert Palmer's 1989 album Addictions: Volume 1 and Buffett's 1984 album Fruitcakes. 

From 1978 to 1983, he played and toured with blues singer Taj Mahal. During 1986, Greenidge released his own album, Mad Music, with fellow Coral Reefer Michael Utley.  He has continued to record with Utley as Club Trini. He continued to work in his native country and  the Trinidad and Tobago Carnival every year since 1979. He won the national steelband competition Panorama twice with the Desperadoes Steel Orchestra in 1991 and 1994, both times with his own compositions.

Discography
Mad Music — Robert Greenidge and Michael Utley (1986; MCA)	
Jubilee — Robert Greenidge and Michael Utley (1987; MCA 42045)	
Heat — Robert Greenidge and Michael Utley (1988; MCA)
Margaritaville Cafe: Late Night Menu — Various Performers (1993; Margaritaville)
Caribbean Paradise — Dennis Desouza (1994; Wirl)
It's Christmas Mon! Steel Pan Music Christmas — Robert Greenidge (1995; Intersound 3529)
Club Trini — Greenidge/Utley - Club Trini (1996; Margaritaville 531041)	
Back in Town — Greenidge/Utley - Club Trini (1999; Club Trini Records)
Margaritaville Cafe: Late Night Live — Club Trini (2000)	
From the Heart — Greenidge/Utley — Club Trini (2003)
 ''Steel Pans on Speak Easy - Don't Tread on Me — 311 (band) (2005)
      Don%27t Tread on Me (album)

"A Coral Reefer Christmas" – Robert Greenidge (2010)

See also
Coral Reefer Band

References

External links
Official website
Club Trini website
Biography at RobertGreenidge.com

Steelpan musicians
Trinidad and Tobago musicians
1950 births
Living people
Coral Reefer Band members